Aulis Vilhelm Sileäkangas (17 June 1923, Pomarkku - 22 December 2013) was a Finnish farmer and politician. He was a member of the Parliament of Finland from 1966 to 1970 and again from 1972 to 1975, representing the Centre Party.

References

1923 births
2013 deaths
People from Pomarkku
Centre Party (Finland) politicians
Members of the Parliament of Finland (1966–70)
Members of the Parliament of Finland (1972–75)
Finnish military personnel of World War II